Nellis may refer to:

People
 Alice Nellis (born 1971), Czech filmmaker
 Duane Nellis (born 1954), American educator and Ohio University president
 William Harrell Nellis (1916-1944), World War II fighter pilot, after whom the Air Force base is named
 William J. Nellis (born 1941), American physicist

Places in the United States
 Nellis, West Virginia, an unincorporated community
 Nellis Air Force Base, Nevada
 Federal Prison Camp, Nellis, a United States federal minimum-security prison, on the base
 Jacob Nellis Farmhouse, a historic farmhouse in Montgomery County, New York
 Nellis Tavern, a historic tavern in Montgomery County, New York  
 Nellis Historic District, Boone County, West Virginia

See also
 Nelis
 Nelissen, a surname
 Nelles
 Nelli (disambiguation)
 Nelliston, New York